West Babylon Senior High School is a high school at 500 Great East Neck Road, West Babylon, New York in Babylon in Suffolk County on Long Island, New York. It is part of the West Babylon Union Free School District.  In 2012, it had an enrollment of 1,531. Its school colors are navy blue and gold and the mascot is an Eagle. The town is known for its beautiful environment. The school was built in 1958 and since then, the school has been fully operational for students from grades 9 to 12. There are three floors all with surrounding staircases on each directional end. The school features two cafeterias, two gymnasiums and an auditorium or "PAC" (Performing Arts Center). Behind the school, there is a football field, baseball field and tennis court.

Notable alumni

Jovan Belcher, American football linebacker
John Cygan, actor
Harold Dieterle, winner of the first season of Top Chef
Billy Koch, professional baseball relief pitcher

Geraldo Rivera, television personality

References

External links
wbscools.org (official site)

Schools in Suffolk County, New York
Public high schools in New York (state)